Tricholaser is a genus of flowering plants belonging to the family Apiaceae.

Its native range is Afghanistan to Western Himalaya.

Species:
 Tricholaser cachemiricum (C.B.Clarke) Alava 
 Tricholaser ovatilobum (Dunn & R.S.Williams) Alava

References

Apiaceae
Apiaceae genera